Leonardo Andrés Medina Gutiérrez (born 30 May 1977) is a Uruguayan footballer that currently plays for Uruguayan Segunda División side Rampla Juniors as striker.

Medina has played for clubs in his homeland of Uruguay, Colombia, Mexico and Chile, where he enjoyed success with Audax Italiano. He also played in the Argentine Primera for Huracán.

Medina has participated in international club tournaments, Copa Libertadores 2007 and Copa Sudamericana 2007, where he made 8 appearances and scored 2 goals, both with Audax Italiano.

Club career

Oriente Petrolero
In July 2009, he joined Bolivian side Oriente Petrolero. On August 24, 2009, he got sent off together with Blooming defender Sergio Jáuregui, after a clash. While leaving the field, Jáuregui performed a running kick to Medina's face, knocking him unconscious. After a short spell with Oriente, he moved to Peruvian club Cienciano.

Cienciano
After a short spell with Oriente, he moved to Peru and joined Cienciano during January 2010. but left the club in July due to lack of playing time.

References

External links
 
  
 
 

1977 births
Living people
Footballers from Montevideo
Uruguayan footballers
Uruguayan expatriate footballers
Uruguayan Primera División players
Argentine Primera División players
Categoría Primera A players
Liga MX players
C.A. Rentistas players
Liverpool F.C. (Montevideo) players
Audax Italiano footballers
C.A. Cerro players
Sud América players
Rampla Juniors players
Chiapas F.C. footballers
Deportivo Pereira footballers
Club Atlético Huracán footballers
Oriente Petrolero players
Expatriate footballers in Chile
Expatriate footballers in Colombia
Expatriate footballers in Bolivia
Uruguayan expatriate sportspeople in Bolivia
Expatriate footballers in Argentina
Uruguayan expatriate sportspeople in Colombia
Expatriate footballers in Mexico
Association football forwards